Violet E. Powell was a British screenwriter active during the 1920s and 1930s. She was married to actor David Powell.

Filmography

 The Beautiful City (1925)
 Just Suppose (1926)
 The White Black Sheep (1926)
 The Rolling Road (1927)
 Poppies of Flanders (1927)
 King's Mate (1928) 
 Toni (1928) 
 Paradise (1928)
 Kitty (1929)
 The Plaything (1929)
 The Girl in the Flat (1934)
 To Be a Lady (1934)
 Badger's Green (1934)

References 

British women screenwriters
Year of birth missing
Year of death missing